State Route 141 (SR 141) is a  state highway that runs southwest-to-northeast in the northwest part of the U.S. state of Georgia. It connects the Buckhead area of Atlanta with Cumming. Its routing exists within portions of Fulton, DeKalb, Gwinnett, Forsyth counties.

Route description

SR 141 begins at an intersection with US 19/SR 9 (Roswell Road NE) in the Buckhead neighborhood of Atlanta, in Fulton County. It travels to the northeast to an intersection with SR 237 (Piedmont Road NE). Just after that intersection, it goes over, but does not have an interchange with SR 400 (T. Harvey Mathis Parkway). Immediately after is the southern terminus of SR 141 Connector (Lenox Road NE). The highway passes just northwest of the Buckhead Heights neighborhood, crosses into DeKalb County, and passes through Brookhaven. SR 141 passes Oglethorpe University and the Peachtree Golf Club, just before passing through Chamblee. In Doraville, it has an intersection with SR 13 Connector and an interchange with Interstate 285 (I-285). The road becomes a freeway on the northeast of the interchange, served by a pair of one-way frontage roads with "Texas U-turns"; it has a few exits along its length. It enters Gwinnett County near the middle of the freeway; near the end of the freeway is SR 140 where it is called Peachtree Parkway. It passes through Peachtree Corners. Then, it crosses over the Chattahoochee River back into Fulton County. It travels through Johns Creek and meets SR 120 (Abbotts Bridge Road). Northeast of there, it enters Forsyth County. The roadway curves to the northwest and then to the north. It has an interchange with US 19/SR 400 (Hospitality Highway), southwest of Cumming. Until 2020, SR 141 ended just to the northwest at SR 9, but it was extended north on Bethelview Road where it now ends at SR 20.  SR 371 was removed from the state highway system as a mileage swap in order to add Bethelview Road to the state highway system.

All of SR 141 from its southern terminus in Buckhead to a point southwest of Duluth is part of the National Highway System, a system of roadways important to the nation's economy, defense, and mobility.

Major intersections

Related routes

Atlanta connector route

State Route 141 Connector (SR 141 Conn.) is a  connecting route of SR 141 that exists entirely within the Buckhead section of Atlanta, in eastern Fulton County. It is known as Lenox Road NE, as well as Paul Coverdell Memorial Parkway, for its entire length. It was built in the early 1990s in conjunction with SR 400 to serve area businesses and offices.

It begins at an intersection with the SR 141 mainline (Peachtree Road NE) just northwest of the Buckhead Heights neighborhood of Atlanta. The highway heads northwest, curves to the west-southwest underneath, where it crosses SR 400 (T. Harvey Mathis Parkway) with a single-point urban interchange. It curves to the southwest to meet its northern terminus, an intersection with SR 237 (Piedmont Road NE), at the Buckhead Forest neighborhood of Atlanta.

SR 141 Conn. is not part of the National Highway System, a system of roadways important to the nation's economy, defense, and mobility.

Gwinnett County connector route
State Route 141 Connector (SR 141 Conn.) is a .8 mile long (1.3 km) connecting route of SR 141 that exists entirely within Gwinnett County. It is just west of Norcross. The route at SR 140 (Jimmy Carter Boulevard) and goes north along a frontage road parallel to SR 141/Peachtree Industrial Boulevard. After the split of SR 141 and Peachtree Industrial Boulevard, SR 141 Conn. merges with Peachtree Industrial Boulevard. The route then turns left onto Holcomb Bridge Road and ends at the intersection of Holcomb Bridge Road and SR 141. The route connects traffic from SR 140 to SR 141 north, since there is no direct entrance ramp between these two roads. SR 141 Conn. south does not exist because traffic can exit from SR 141 south directly to SR 140.

Peachtree Industrial Boulevard

Peachtree Industrial Boulevard is a road in the U.S. state of Georgia that begins in Chamblee and ends in Buford. Between Interstate 285 and SR 140 (Jimmy Carter Boulevard), the road is concurrent with SR 141. North of SR 140, in Peachtree Corners, Peachtree Industrial Boulevard splits from SR 141 and continues to the northeast as a highway with at least four lanes and center median, traveling through the cities of Peachtree Corners, Duluth, Suwanee, Sugar Hill, and Buford. The portion of the road concurrent with SR 141 is maintained by the state; the rest is maintained by Gwinnett County.

Peachtree Industrial Boulevard was originally built in the 1960s. The portion of the road concurrent to SR 141 was upgraded to a limited-access highway in the 1980s and 1990s.

In 2008, the section within the city limits of Chamblee was renamed to Peachtree Boulevard, to reflect the changing nature of the city. Prior to this change, the "industrial" name extended until Peachtree Road merges in near the city line with present-day Brookhaven. In November 2018, the Doraville City Council passed a resolution to authorize the city manager to rename Peachtree Industrial Boulevard within the city limits to Peachtree Boulevard, following the changes made by Chamblee. However, these changes have not yet taken place.

In 2013, Gwinnett County decreased the speed limit the road to 45 mph between SR 141 (Peachtree Parkway) and SR 20 (Nelson Brogdon Boulevard) and 50 mph between SR 20 and the Hall County line. The goal of the change was to reduce speeding and accidents.

In June 2018, the Atlanta Regional Commission Board approved funding to equip intersections along Peachtree Industrial Boulevard with connected vehicle technology.

Gwinnett County has looked at adding and improving sidewalks along Peachtree Industrial Boulevard.

The Western Gwinnett Bikeway is a multi-use trail under construction along Peachtree Industrial Boulevard.

Orphaned segments 
There are six road segments that previously carried State Route 141 or a derivative designation that no longer do.

  What is now Georgia SR 371 once was SR 141 between Georgia SR 9 and SR 20. It was changed to its present number in 1971.  It was removed from the state highway system in 2020 when SR 141 was extended north along Bethelview Road, essentially replacing its original route with a new alignment.
  The State Route 141 designation was previously used in DeKalb County between Tucker and US 78 in what is now Stone Mountain Park on what is now Hugh Howell Highway (SR 236) which was at the time named Rosser Road.
 Prior to construction of Peachtree Parkway and the extension and re-routing of SR 141 to Buckhead, SR 141 followed what is present day Medlock Bridge Road from its current intersection with Peachtree Parkway, into downtown Norcross and became North Peachtree Road, crossed the railroad tracks at Park Street, and then traveled on South Peachtree until its terminus at Buford Highway (SR 13). When plans were drawn to re-route SR 141 to its present alignment, GDOT changed the designation of this roadway to SR 141 Connector.  This designation stayed in effect until 1981, when this segment was turned over to the county and converted to local roads. What is now SR 141 between the Buckhead junction with Roswell Road (SR 9) and Motors Industrial Way (present day SR 13 Connector) was designated along with Motors Industrial Way as SR 13W before it was made part of the newly aligned SR 141.
 With the construction of Interstate 85, Norcross Tucker road, which at the time was a contiguous road, was designated SR 141 Connector, and the small segment of South Peachtree Road between Buford Highway and Norcross Tucker Road was redesigned SR 141 Spur. The South Peachtree Road (SR 141 Spur) was converted to a local road in 1981 along with truncation of SR 141 Connector to Norcross Tucker Road between South Peachtree Rd in Norcross and Interstate 85.
 As Jimmy Carter Boulevard was constructed in the 1970s, Norcross Tucker Road was split into North Norcross Tucker Road and South Norcross Tucker Road, and a portion of the road was incorporated into Jimmy Carter Boulevard. In 1981, Jimmy Carter Boulevard was designated as SR 141 Connector between Peachtree Industrial Boulevard and Interstate 85. It was converted to State Route 140 in 1984-1985 timeframe and the SR 141 Connector designation was used for what is present day SR 141 Connector at the 141/Peachtree Industrial Boulevard interchange when the Jimmy Carter Boulevard/SR 141 intersection was upgraded to a grade separated intersection.
  The 17.5 mile segment of State Route 369 East of SR 9 from North of Cumming to Gainesville was designated as SR 141 until 1970, when it was extended west to SR 20, and redesigned to its present-day number.

See also
  
 
 Peachtree Road
 Transportation in Atlanta

References

External links

 Georgia Roads (Routes 141 - 160)
 Georgia State Route 141 on State-Ends.com

141
Transportation in Fulton County, Georgia
Transportation in DeKalb County, Georgia
Transportation in Gwinnett County, Georgia
Transportation in Forsyth County, Georgia
Transportation in Brookhaven, Georgia
Chamblee, Georgia
Doraville, Georgia
Roads in Atlanta